Para sa Hopeless Romantic is a 2015 Philippine teen romance film based on the best-selling romantic novel of the same name by Marcelo Santos III. The film is directed by Andoy Ranay, starring James Reid, Nadine Lustre, Julia Barretto and Iñigo Pascual. It was distributed by Viva Films and Star Cinema and was released on May 13, 2015, in select theaters across the Philippines.

Summary
Becca (Nadine Lustre) thought that she had everything she could wish for in her life, until Nikko (James Reid) broke up with her. Everything in her life starts to fall apart.
To recover, she started writing a story about Ryan (Inigo Pascual), a boy who harbors a secret crush on his best friend Maria (Julia Barretto). But before he can tell her his real feelings for her, he got into an accident and fell into a coma.
Can all four of them find the "happy ending" that each one of them has been hoping for?

Cast

Main cast

James Reid as Nikko John Borja
Nadine Lustre as Rebecca "Becca" Del Mundo
Julia Barretto as Maria Kristina Lapuz
Inigo Pascual as Ryan Sebastian

Supporting cast
AJ Muhlach as RJ Bustamante
Shy Carlos as Jackie Reyes
Jackie Lou Blanco as Nikko's mom
Teresa Loyzaga as Becca's mom
Lander Vera Perez as Becca's dad
Cherie Gil as Miss Katigbak 
Paul Jake Castillo as Matt
Donnalyn Bartolome as Betty
Issa Pressman as former classmate of Becca
Arvic Rivero as Onyok
Jourdaine Castillo as Faye
Marcelo Santos III as Editor-in-Chief

Release
The film's release was changed a number of times. It was originally scheduled to be released in January 2015, then it was moved to March 2015. Then finally, Star Cinema changed its original release date and moved it to May 13, 2015.

Reception

Critical response
Para Sa Hopeless Romantic received mixed reviews from movie critics.

Oggs Cruz from Rappler called the movie "decent, harmless, and authentically perceptive", indicating that the movie is less needlessly complicated and is defiantly anchored in reality, which sets it apart from other romance movie, saying:
"Perhaps the most remarkable thing about Para sa Hopeless Romantic is how it feels defiantly anchored in reality. While the rest of romantic comedies seem to be situated in an alternate Philippines where everything is glittered and glossy, giving them all their well-to-do characters reasons to be concerned with love instead of other more pressing things, Ranay’s film is set in a world that is more familiar and more palpable."

Cruz also praised lead actress Nadine Lustre's performance, noting the sincerity in her portrayal of Becca, stating "Lustre makes her character’s seemingly unimportant struggle moving. She laments not being able to move on, to the point of creating grim stories about the futility of love. She weeps with utmost determination and sincerity, and giggles with glee when presented with an opportunity of finding a brand new romance through ridiculous conversations via chair-bound graffiti."

Philbert Ortiz-Dy of Click the City meanwhile gave a negative review of the film, stating that Para Sa Hopeless Romantic is mainly hopeless. He further states, "And so the whole story is just about waiting for two people to get back together, even though it isn't entirely clear why they ought to be together. There isn't much reason to root for this outcome. The film doesn't invest much in their happiness as a couple. The film uses talk of destiny to wave away the lack of actual story development"  Dy further tweeted that the film was "hopeless, yes, romantic, no."

Box office
According to Rod Magaru, the film had one of the lowest earnings of a Viva produced, Star Cinema merged  movie earning P8M on its opening day. The latest update from Box Office Mojo puts the total gross at approximately P50M.

References

External links

Para sa Hopeless Romantic at Star Cinema's Information

2015 films
2015 romantic comedy-drama films
2010s teen romance films
2010s Tagalog-language films
Philippine teen romance films
Philippine romantic comedy-drama films
Star Cinema films
Star Cinema drama films
Star Cinema comedy films
Viva Films films
Films based on Philippine novels
Films set in universities and colleges
2010s English-language films
Films directed by Andoy Ranay